Zuyevo is a rural locality (a village) in Ivanovskoye Rural Settlement, Vashkinsky District, Vologda Oblast, Russia. The population was 11 as of 2002.

Geography 
Zuyevo is located 49 km north of Lipin Bor (the district's administrative centre) by road. Alyoshino is the nearest rural locality.

References 

Rural localities in Vashkinsky District